NGC 2119 (also identified as UGC 3380 or PGC 18136) is an  elliptical galaxy in the constellation Orion. It was discovered by Édouard Stephan on January 9, 1880.

References

External links
  The Interactive NGC Catalog Online 
 Revised NGC Data for NGC 2119 
 Basic data : NGC 2119 -- Galaxy
  NASA/IPAC Extragalactic Database
 SkyView Images

Elliptical galaxies
2119
Orion (constellation)
018136